James Herd (born August 13th, 1932) is a former television production executive, Pizza Hut manager, and professional wrestling executive. Herd was the Executive Vice President of World Championship Wrestling (WCW) from 1988 to 1992 following Turner Broadcasting's acquisition of the National Wrestling Alliance-affiliated Jim Crockett Promotions in 1988. However, his tenure received much criticism from wrestlers and fans alike.

Early life and career 
Before beginning his role in WCW, Herd had been a station manager for the St. Louis TV station KPLR-TV, which broadcast the then-popular wrestling show Wrestling at the Chase. Later on, he served as a regional manager for Pizza Hut.

World Championship Wrestling 
Herd was hired as Executive Vice President of World Championship Wrestling in 1988, through his connections and friendship with Turner executive Jack Petrik. His tenure officially began on January 3, 1989.

Criticism 
Many wrestling personalities, fans, and workers have openly criticized Herd for his lack of knowledge of pro wrestling and lack of respect for established wrestlers. Ric Flair in particular stated that Herd "knew nothing about wrestling, other than the fact that the station he ran had a hot show". During his run in WCW, Herd tried to compete with Vince McMahon and the World Wrestling Federation by introducing the same kind of gimmicks that were a part of McMahon's WWF at the time, alienating the diehard NWA audience. For example, he once tried to come up with a tag team called The Hunchbacks (with the gimmick in which they could not be pinned because their humps would prevent their shoulders from touching the mats) and after that idea was rejected by the booking committee he came up with the bell-wearing team, The Ding Dongs (portrayed by The Rock n Roll Rebels). After that, he came up with Big Josh, a lumberjack who was accompanied by dancing bears. Stan Hansen left the organization to return to All Japan Pro Wrestling after the idea was pitched to him to become a part of the comedic cowboy stable called The Desperados. Jim Cornette and Stan Lane also left the organization in October 1990, breaking up the Midnight Express and leaving Bobby Eaton on his own, after Herd would blame his many failures on Cornette and others. Even The Road Warriors, as Animal has stated on WWE Home Video's Road Warriors DVD, had a fallout with Herd as well and resigned from WCW in June 1990.

Feud with Ric Flair 
Herd regularly clashed with the then NWA World Heavyweight Champion and booking committee member Ric Flair. According to Flair, Herd wanted him to drop his entire "Nature Boy" persona, cut his signature bleached blond hair, and adopt a Roman gladiator gimmick by the name of Spartacus in order to "change with the times". This did not sit well with Flair and the committee (committee member Kevin Sullivan was quoted as saying: "While we're doing this, why don't we go to Yankee Stadium and change Babe Ruth's number?"). Herd believed Flair's time was over as a main event player and the big money was with Sting and Lex Luger. This backstage feud hit its breaking point when during contract renegotiation Flair refused to take a pay cut and he moved away from the main event position as he was by far the company's biggest draw. He also refused to drop the title to Luger as Herd wanted, saying that he had promised to drop it to Sting and Herd had previously agreed. Herd did not care what he had said earlier and accused Flair of holding up the company, but Flair said he was simply holding Herd to his word. Flair tried to compromise with Herd and offered to drop the title to fellow Horsemen Barry Windham, feeling that Windham was long passed over and deserved a run with the title. However, as Flair was planning to leave to wrestle Windham so he could lose the title, on July 1, 1991, two weeks before the Great American Bash, Herd fired Flair from WCW and stripped him of the WCW World Heavyweight Championship. However, Flair was still in possession of the physical championship belt.

Flair brings the belt to WWF's TV programs 
Upon notification, Flair called Vince McMahon of the rival World Wrestling Federation to inform him of the situation. McMahon offered Flair a deal with the WWF in exchange for him sending McMahon the belt and Flair obliged. A couple of weeks later, promos were being shown of Bobby Heenan with Flair's belt on WWF television. NWA and WCW officials expressed frustration at Herd's actions and amidst loud "We Want Flair!" chants at WCW events during this period made a final attempt to save face by offering Flair substantially more money to return, but their efforts failed.

Legacy and aftermath 
The matter with Flair caused a lawsuit between the two companies, but eventually the lawsuit was dropped. In the 2008 WWE DVD Nature Boy Ric Flair: The Definitive Collection, Flair said he kept the "Big Gold Belt" because he was never paid back his $25,000 initial deposit for the NWA title, plus interest, which totaled $38,000. Herd resigned from WCW on January 8, 1992 and was replaced by Kip Allen Frey. Flair returned to WCW in February 1993.

References 

1939 births
American television producers
Living people
Businesspeople from St. Louis
World Championship Wrestling executives